Attiwell Wood (1728-1784) was an Irish politician, barrister and Law Officer of the eighteenth century.

Background

He was a native of County Cork. He was born into a family which had a long association with the town of Bandon; an earlier Attiwell Wood, probably his grandfather, was a member of Bandon Corporation in 1702. There is reason to believe that the eldest son in each generation of the Wood family was named Attiwell, and the tradition continued up to the late nineteenth century.

Career

He entered the University of Dublin in 1744 and the Middle Temple in 1747. He was called to the Irish Bar in 1753. He became Third Serjeant-at-law (Ireland) in 1777 and was made Second Serjeant in 1779; he held the latter office until his death. He sat in the Irish House of Commons as member for Castlemartyr from 1769 to 1776, and for Clonakilty from 1776 to 1783. He died in March of the following year.

Marriage and children

He married Elizabeth Falkiner, daughter of Sir Riggs Falkiner, 1st Baronet and his first wife Mary Barker. Sir Riggs represented the same two constituencies in reverse order: presumably he and his son-in-law did a "swap" as to which seat each would hold. Attiwell and Elizabeth had at least one son, also named  Attiwell, who married Mary Brasier, daughter of Kilner Brasier, and a daughter Louisa, who married Hugh Norcott (died 1834) JP, of Castleconnell and Springfield, County Limerick. Louisa died in 1839; she and Hugh had no children.

A later Attiwell Wood, who was probably the Serjeant's great-grandson, is recorded as a landowner in County Cork in the 1870s.

References
Bennett, George, The History of Bandon Henry and Coghlan 1862
Burke's Peerage 107th Edition Delaware 2003
Hart, A.R. History of the King's Serjeants at law in Ireland Dublin Four Courts Press 2000
Smyth, Joseph Constantine "Chronicle of the Law Officers of Ireland" Henry Butterworths London 1839
White, James Grove Historical and topographical notes on Buttevant, Castletownroche, Doneraile, Mallow and places in their vicinity, Guy and Co. Cork 1905

Notes

1728 births
1784 deaths
People from County Cork
Members of the Middle Temple
Members of the Parliament of Ireland (pre-1801) for County Cork constituencies
Irish MPs 1769–1776
Irish MPs 1776–1783
Alumni of Trinity College Dublin
Year of birth uncertain
Serjeants-at-law (Ireland)